Hans Wilhelmsson (February 14, 1936 – January 5, 2004) was a Swedish speed skater. He represented IF Castor in club competitions. Outside of his sporting career, he worked as a car salesman, insurance agent and bank director.

He died in January 2004 at 67 years old.

Merits
Fourth place in men's speed skating (500 meters) - Olympics 1960

Awards
Sports performance of the year - 1960

References 

1936 births
2004 deaths
Speed skaters at the 1960 Winter Olympics
Swedish male speed skaters
Olympic speed skaters of Sweden
People from Eskilstuna
Sportspeople from Södermanland County